Stefano Arteaga (born Esteban de Arteaga y López; December 26, 1747 - September 30, 1799) was a Spanish-born writer on theater and music, active in Italy.

Biography
Arteaga was a young man, already a Jesuit priest, when the suppression of the order in Spain, forced him into exile. He went to Italy and became a member of the Academy of Padua. He afterwards resided at Bologna, hosted by Cardinal Albergati, and there made the acquaintance of Padre Martini, at whose instance he investigated the rise and progress of the Italian stage. His work, entitled Rivoluzioni del teatro musicale Italiano, dalla suo origine fine al presente, (two vols., 1783), is an important source for the history of music. A second edition, in three volumes, appeared at Venice in 1785. He also left behind him a manuscript treatise on the rhythm of the ancients. Arteaga died in Paris.

Works
Rivoluzioni del teatro musicale italiano, Venezia, (primo libro 1783, secondo libro 1785)
Del ritmo sonoro e del ritmo muto degli antichi Dissertazioni VII
Trattato del bello ideale (in lingua spagnola)
Dell'influenza degli Arabi sull'origine della poesia

Notes

References
 

18th-century Spanish Jesuits
Spanish non-fiction writers
Writers about music
Writers about theatre
1747 births
1799 deaths
Spanish male writers
18th-century Spanish writers
18th-century male writers
Male non-fiction writers